Alan John Noonan (13 October 1947 – 13 April 2011) was an Australian rules footballer who played in the Victorian Football League (VFL) for the Essendon Football Club from 1966 to 1976 and the Richmond Football Club in 1977.

Noonan grew up in Warragul. He made his VFL debut in 1966 and in his 11-year career for Essendon kicked 420 goals and played 183 games. In 1974 he kicked 77 goals, one of seven times he topped Essendon's goalkicking.

Essendon Football Club Committee
Noonan holds the record for the Essendon Football Club's shortest ever term as a committeeman. In the 1992 Club election, he was elected to the committee. Within a couple of days, 50 "lost" votes were found, a recount was conducted and, with 18 of the votes for Noonan declared invalid, Barry J. Keam (who served on the Essendon Football Club Committee from 1976 to 1995) was restored to his place on the Committee.

Noonan later served on the Essendon Football Club Committee as Vice-President from 1994 to 1995.

After football
Noonan was a teacher whose career extended from the 1970s to the 2010s. His schools included Aberfeldie, Pascoe Vale South and Roxburgh Homestead Primary Schools.  He coached the football teams at all his schools.

Death
Noonan died on 13 April 2011 after a long battle with cancer, aged 63.

Notes

References
 Maplestone, M., Flying Higher: History of the Essendon Football Club 1872–1996, Essendon Football Club, (Melbourne), 1996. 
 Ross, J. (ed), 100 Years of Australian Football 1897–1996: The Complete Story of the AFL, All the Big Stories, All the Great Pictures, All the Champions, Every AFL Season Reported, Viking, (Ringwood), 1996. 
The Encyclopedia Of League Footballers (Every AFL/VFL player since 1897) Page 326 by Jim Main and Russell Holmesby published in 1992

External links

1947 births
Australian rules footballers from Ballarat
Essendon Football Club players
Richmond Football Club players
Warragul Football Club players
2011 deaths
Place of death missing
People from Warragul